An election for the President of the Legislative Council of Hong Kong took place on 19 February 1993 for members to among themselves elect the first President after abolishing the practice for the Governor to preside. Deputy President John Joseph Swaine was unopposed and became the first elected President.

Background 
Hong Kong Royal Instructions was one of the principal constitutional documents of British Hong Kong that includes the formation of the Legislative Council.

The Governor of Hong Kong had been mandated to preside at meetings of the Council since the start of the British rule. In 1990, the position of Deputy President was created, who shall be appointed by the Governor. A year later, the Governor was no longer required to attend every meetings. David Wilson, then Governor of Hong Kong, announced he intended to appoint John Joseph Swaine as deputy in 1991. Swaine assumed office in the first meeting of the next session in October 1991. In his address to the Council, Wilson confirmed most of the meetings of the Council will be chaired by Swaine.

In October 1992, with the upcoming handover of Hong Kong, Chris Patten, the new Governor, announced he is handing over the presidency of the Council to elected President as soon as possible, as part of separating the non-government membership of the Executive and the Legislative Council. Patten also called on the Council to develop further its relationship with the Government, and that he "will be answerable as the head of the executive to this Council rather than being restricted to the role of President".

Amendments announced in December 1992 and effective on 19 February 1993 ended the role of Governor as the President. Both the President and President's Deputy became elected posts by members of the Council. The amendment therefore triggered the election of President for the first time in colonial history.

Election 
The election took place during the Council meeting on 19 February 1993. David Ford, Chief Secretary and the most senior ex-officio member, presided over the proceedings. The President's deputy was first elected. Veteran legislator Elsie Tu was nominated by Andrew Wong, independent, and seconded by pro-business Stephen Cheong and pro-China Tam Yiu-chung. Without any other nominations, Tu was elected with unanimous support. She then proceeded to chair meeting.

For the election of President, John Swaine was backed by Allen Lee, convenor of Co-operative Resources Centre, Martin Lee, chairman of United Democrats, and Tam Yiu-chung. Tu declared Swaine, the only candidate, has been elected the President of the Council.

Swaine said the appointment was symbolic of the Council's progress towards independence from the Executive Council, and he is deeply honoured to be the first President. Swaine added he hoped to maintain the tradition of the impartial speaker, the dignity and integrity of the Council to continue to serve the public.

Hamish Macleod, Financial Secretary, then moved the motion to amend the Standing Orders of the Legislative Council to bring it in line with the Royal Instructions, and to provide the framework for the Governor to hand over the presidency of this Council to an elected President. Macleod said the Government is "taking steps to amend the Royal Instructions further to accommodate the stand-in arrangements for the President as contemplated by Members" and will consult members. After the amendment was agreed to without opposition, the President adjourned the Council.

Articles

References 

Legislative Council of Hong Kong
1993 in Hong Kong
President of the Hong Kong Legislative Council elections